Tompall & the Glaser Brothers were an American country music group composed of three brothers: Chuck (February 27, 1936 – June 10, 2019), Jim (December 16, 1937 – April 6, 2019), and Tompall (September 3, 1933 – August 13, 2013) Glaser. The Glaser Brothers started singing together at country fairs and contests in and around the Spalding area when they were preteens. In 1957, the group got their big break when they appeared on the Arthur Godfrey's Talent Show and attracted the attention of several well known country stars, including Marty Robbins.

Biography
Between 1960 and 1975, the trio recorded ten studio albums and charted nine singles on the Billboard Hot Country Singles charts. (Their material for Bravo Records was released under the name The Charleston Trio.) The Glasers became members of the Grand Ole Opry in the 1960s. The group took a hiatus from 1973 to 1978, during which time each brother pursued individual interests. They reunited in 1979 and released several singles and two albums including, Loving Her Was Easier, which reached #2 on the Billboard charts.

In 1962 the Glaser Brothers started a publishing company and began to take on songwriters that other name brand studios had chosen to ignore. One of those songwriters was John Hartford, who wrote  Gentle on My Mind, a song that has been recorded by over 300 artists including Glen Campbell, Elvis Presley, and Johnny Cash,  among others. The popularity of the song is enormous and it has been performed live over 6 million times.

In 1970 the brothers opened their own studio at 916 19th Ave. South in Nashville, TN. The new studio, Glaser Sound, was often referred to as Hillbilly Central because it was a haven for artists who wanted to have more artistic control over their own music and careers. The studio included a publishing company, production company, talent agency, and design services for album covers. In that venue creative experimentation thrived  as new opportunities for songwriters and artists became commonplace.

On the very day that the publishing company was sold in 1975, Chuck was rushed to the hospital with a stroke. Following his recovery, which also included relearning how to sing, Chuck began to explore other lucrative business ventures including producing a syndicated television show, and a children’s album among others
. Tompall and Jim continued with their musical careers, both achieving success as solo artists.

In 1990 the brothers were asked to reunite for one final show at the Grand Ole Opry in a tribute to Hank Snow. Out of respect for Snow, they accepted the offer.

In 2013, a documentary entitled From Nebraska Ranchers to Nashville Rebels: The Story of the Glaser Brothers was released. Produced by Newshound Productions, the film provides new information about the brothers as individuals and as a group. The sources for the documentary came from family, friends, and music industry insiders. The documentary features comments by Jim Glaser, Chuck Glaser, Cowboy Jack Clement, Bobby Bare, Kinky Friedman, Ronny Robbins, Robert K. Oermann, Marshall Chapman, Gordon Stoker, Willis Hoover, Bill Holmes, Doyle Grisham among others.

Tompall died on August 13, 2013, at the age of 79, leaving behind his widow, June Johnson Glaser. His funeral service was conducted at the Cathedral of the Incarnation in Nashville, Tennessee, on August 16, 2013. The private family service was conducted by Father Edward Steiner, senior pastor at the Cathedral. Jim died on April 6, 2019, aged 81. Chuck died on June 10, 2019, aged 83.

Discography

Albums

Singles

APeaked at No. 92 on Billboard Hot 100.

References

American country music groups
Grand Ole Opry members
Sibling musical trios
Curb Records artists
Decca Records artists
Elektra Records artists